Felix Wolfes (September 2, 1892 in Hannover – March 28, 1971 in Boston) was an American educator, conductor and composer.

Biography
Felix was born to Jewish parents in Hannover, Germany. After graduating from high school, he attended the Leipzig Conservatory, where he studied music theory with Max Reger and piano with Robert Teichmüller. He also studied with Richard Strauss and later in Strasbourg with Hans Pfitzner. His conducting debut was in Breslau in 1923. He then worked as musical director and opera conductor in Essen (1924–31) and Dortmund (until 1933).

In Dortmund he had to leave his position in the spring of 1933 due to the Nazi rise to power. He emigrated first to France and later to the US. He conducted the Monte Carlo opera in 1936 and 1937. While in France, he was also the teacher of composer Lukas Foss, who studied orchestration with him.

In 1938 he moved to New York city, where he worked as an assistant conductor at the Metropolitan Opera, where he stayed until 1947. In 1948 he followed a call to the New England Conservatory in Boston, where he taught for two decades. He died in Boston, aged 78.

Musical compositions and editing
Wolfes composed at least 140 songs that are published.  Most were composed after he moved to Boston, but he continued to set German poetry.  There are a few songs in English, however.  As a disciple of Strauss and Pfitzner, Wolfes composed vocal works using similar complex rhythmic and harmonic materials.

He was also highly skilled in editing and preparing the vocal scores for operas from the full orchestral score.  Some of his important work in this area was for the Strauss opera Arabella and the Pfitzner opera Palestrina.  He also prepared vocal scores for Strauss's opera Die schweigsame Frau and Pfitzner's operas Das Herz and Die Rose vom Liebesgarten.

Works 
Ausgewählte Lieder in 5 Bänden für Singstimme und Klavier (Selected Songs in Five Volumes), Mercury Music Corporation, New York 1962

Volume I, songs for high voice
1.  Die Nachtigall (Theodor Storm), 1930
2.  Weihnachten (Joseph von Eichendorff), 1940
3.  Weinende Frau (Friedrich Schnack), 1943
4.  Auf dem See (Ernst Bertram), 1943
5.  Todelust (Joseph von Eichendorff), 1944
6.  Du schlank und rein wie eine Flamme (Stefan George), 1944
7.  Spruch des Engels (Hugo von Hofmannsthal), 1945
8.  Vorfrühling (Hugo von Hofmannsthal), 1947
9.  Totengräber und Mädchen (Friedrich Schnack), 1949
10. Möwenflug (Conrad Ferdinand Meyer), 1950

Volume II, songs for high voice
11.  Blume, Baum, Vogel (Hermann Hesse), 1951
12.  Ein Winterabend (Georg Trakl), 1952
13.  Tief in den Himmel verklingt (Ricarda Huch), 1952
14.  Dämmrung senkte sich von oben (Goethe), 1953
15.  Herbstliche Tröstung (Werner Bergengruen), 1956
16.  An eine Strophe (Ernst Bertram), 1956
17.  Gelassenheit (Wang We, tr. Manfred Hausmann), 1956
18.  Lied (Wilhelm Klemm), 1957
19.  Erdgewalt (Rudolf G. Binding), 1958
20.  Blühender Kirschbaum (Christian Wagner), 1958

Volume III, songs for medium voice
1.  Die Zeder, 1962
2.  Immer Wieder, 1962
3.  Auf dem See, 1962
4.  Der Feind, 1962
5.  Auf Wanderung, 1962
6.  Herbst, 1962
7.  Stimme der Mutter, 1962
8.  Am Ziele, 1962
9.  Das letzte Haus, 1962

Volume IV, songs for medium voice
10. In einer Dämmerstunde (Wilhelm von Scholz), 1955
11. Oase El Kjem (Albert H. Rausch), 1955
12. Vergiss, vergiss (Rainer Maria Rilke), 1956
13. Verschneiter Fluss (Liu Dsung-Yüan, tr. Manfred Hausmann)
14. Zigeunerlied (Johann Wolfgang von Goethe), 1956
15. Erdgewalt (Rudolf G. Binding), 1958
16. Gelbe Rose(Ludwig Strauss), 1958
17. Gefunden (Johann Wolfgang von Goethe), 1958

Volume V, songs for low voice

Selected Lieder, ed. John S. Bowman and Richard Aslanian, Theodore Presser Company, Bryn Mawr, Pennsylvania

Volume VI, songs for high voice, 1987
1.  Unter den Sternen (Conrad Ferdinand Meyer), 1948
2.  Todesmusick (Franz von Schober), 1960
3.  Herbstbild (Friedrich Hebbel), 1960
4.  Venedig (Friedrich Nietzsche)
5.  Kleine Rat (Wolfgang Amadeus Mozart), 1961
6.  In den Nachmittag geflüstert (Georg Trakl), 1961
7.  Das Ende des Festes (Conrad Ferdinand Meyer), 1963
8.  Der Hecht (Christian Morgenstern), 1963
9.  Rotkehlchen (Wilhelm Busch), 1964
10.  Frühlingslied (Friederike Kempner), 1965
11.  Auf eine Lampe (Eduard Mörike), 1968

Volume VII, songs for medium voice, 1987
1.  Verklärter Herbst (Georg Trakl), 1940
2.  Nachklänge Beethovenscher Musik (Clemens Brentano), 1952
3.  Der Einsiedler (Joseph von Eichendorff), 1953
4.  Es geht eine dunkle Wolk' herein (German Folksong from the Thirty Years' War), 1953
5.  Verfall (Georg Trakl), 1953
6.  Septembermorgen (Eduard Mörike), 1955
7.  Ein Traum ist unser Leben (Johann Gottfried von Herder), 1956
8.  Das trunkne Lied (Friedrich Nietzsche), 1961
9.  Es ist ein Schnee gefallen (15th century German Folksong), 1962
10.  Eingelegte Ruder (Conrad Ferdinand Meyer), 1963
11.  Die beiden Esel (Christian Morgenstern), 1963
12.  Inschrift auf eine Uhr mit den drei Horen (Eduard Mörike), 1965
13.  Gesang einer gefangenen Amsel (Georg Trakl), 1965
14.  In ein altes Stammbuch (Georg Trakl), 1965
15.  Früh im Wagen (Eduard Mörike), 1967

Volume VIII, songs for low voice, 1991
1.  Abschied vom Leben (Stefan Zweig), 1952
2.  Lied Kaspar Hausers (Paul Verlaine, tr. Richard Dehmel), 1926
3.  Die stille Stadt (Richard Dehmel), 1951
4.  Grabschrift eines Mannes (Rudolf Binding), 1959
5.  Die zwei Brüder (Paul Pfitzner), 1959
6.  In der letzten Stunde (Paul Pfitzner), 1959
7.  Die Hölle (Manfred Hausmann), 1962
8.  Ein Mönch spricht zu Gott (Wilhelm von Scholz), 1966
9.  Schlaf ein! (Alexander von Bernus), 1966
10.  Abendgespräch (Hermann Hesse), 1966
11.  Verlorenheit (Hermann Hesse), 1967
12.  Im Nebel (Hermann Hesse), 1941
13.  Allein (Hermann Hesse), 1945

Volume IX, songs for high voice, 1991
1.  Die Birke (Hermann Hesse), 1951
2.  Über die Felder (Hermann Hesse), 1951
3.  Am einen Schmetterling (Josef Weinheber), 1952
4.  Die Schritte (Albrecht Goes), 1960
5.  Am eine Tote (Josef Weinheber), 1960
6.  Traumboot (Manfred Hausmann), 1961
7.  Im Grase hingestreckt (Hermann Hesse), 1962
8.  Verlorener Klang (Hermann Hesse), 1962
9.  Was ist die Welt? (Hugo von Hofmannsthal), 1962
10.  Weisse Wolken (Hermann Hesse), 1963
11.  Spätblau (Hermann Hesse), 1964
12.  Symphonie (Hermann Hesse), 1964

Volume X, songs for medium voice, 1992
1.  Bei Mondaufgang (Sao-Han, tr. Hans Bethge), 1946
2.  Sylphide, Josef Weinheber), 1955
3.  Scheidende Seele (Albrecht Schaeffer), 1956
4.  Heim in den Anbeginn (Werner Bergengruen), 1956
5.  Am Gartenfenster (Albrecht Goes), 1958
6.  Das Glasperlenspiel (Hermann Hesse), 1958
7.  Spruch für eine Sonnenuhr (Rudolf G. Binding), 1958
8.  Jahraus-Jahrein (Josef Weinheber), 1959
9.  Zu Musik (Ricarda Huch), 1959
10.  Die Liebenden (Georg von der Vring), 1959
11.  Still zu wissen... (Josef Weinheber), 1961
12.  Die Frauen von Ravenna (Hermann Hesse), 1961
13.  Volkslied (After the French) (Manfred Hausmann), 1963

Volume XI, songs for medium voice, 1992
1.  Den Toten (Josef Weinheber), 1953
2.  Eisnacht (Siegbert Stehmann), 1954
3.  Tausend Male (Christian Wagner), 1958
4.  Ecce homo! (Veikko Antero Koskenniemi, tr. Johannes Öhquist), 1960
5.  Nacht (Bo Djü, tr. Manfred Hausmann), 1960
6.  Nachtlied (Georg von der Vring), 1962
7.  Der Tod (Bernhard von der Marwitz), 1963
8.  Der Dichter (Hermann Hesse), 1964
9.  Kleiner Gesang (Hermann Hesse), 1964
10.  Märzsonne (Hermann Hesse), 1969
11.  Knarren eines geknickten Astes (Hermann Hesse), 1964
12.  Aufgehender Mond (Georg von der Vring), 1965

Volume XII, songs for high voice, 1996
1.  Brunnen-Inschrift (Wilhelm von Scholz), 1945
2.  Nun leuchtet schon wieder (Unknown poet), 1951
3a.  Die kleine Passion (original version) (Gottfried Keller), 1954
3b.  Die kleine Passion (abridged version), 1954
4.  Orpheus (Rudolf Binding), 1960
5.  Relief (Saladin Schmitt), 1961
6.  Andenken (Lili Medhat), 1962
7.  Rote Pantoffeln (Heinrich Heine), 1962
8.  Melodie (Ricarda Huch), 1962
9.  An einen Dichter (Albrecht Schaeffer), 1963
10.  Manche Nacht (Richard Dehmel), 1967

Volume XIII, settings of poems by Hermann Hesse, ed. Richard Aslanian, 2008
1.  Nacht, 1966
2.  Traurigkeit, 1966
3.  Weisse Rose in der Dämmerung, 1966
4.  Weg in die Einsamkeit, 1967
5.  Bei Nacht, 1967
6.  Leise wie die Gondeln..., 1967
7.  Spruch, 1968
8.  Verwelkende Rosen, 1968
9.  Sprache des Frühlings, 1968
10.  Aufhorchen, 1968
11.  Bei der Nachtricht vom Tod eines Freundes, 1968
12.  Herbstvögel, 1969
13.  Hingabe, 1969
14.  Wie eine Welle, 1969
15.  Kindheit des Zauberers, 1969
16.  Der Blütenzweig, 1969
17.  Aus der Kindheit her, 1969

See also
Richard Strauss
Hans Pfitzner

Footnotes

References 
.
 Dacus, Viola R. An introduction to the songs of Felix Wolfes with complete chronological catalogue (UMI, Louisiana State Univ.), Ann Arbor, MI 1995.
 Harrower, Rexford. In Memoriam Felix Wolfes. In: Castrum Peregrini 107–109 (1973), p. 166.
 Rectanus, Hans (German). Unsterbliche Melodie. Die Lieder von Felix Wolfes. In: Mitteilungen der Hans Pfitzner-Gesellschaft 28 (1972).

External links 
 The Lied and Art Song Texts Page
  A book on Dortmund during the Nazi era; see page 14 for a photo of Felix Wolfes

1892 births
1971 deaths
20th-century classical composers
20th-century German composers
20th-century American composers
20th-century American male musicians
German classical composers
German male classical composers
Jewish American classical composers
Jewish classical musicians
Jewish songwriters
Jewish emigrants from Nazi Germany to the United States
New England Conservatory faculty
American people of German descent
Hanoverian emigrants to the United States
20th-century American Jews